Sant Kavi Jagjivan Das (or Jagiwan Das, 1727 Sardaha, Chas - 1761) is the founder of the Satnami denomination of Hinduism in Upper India.

Works
Leading a family life Sant Kavi Jagjivan Das proved to be a great Saint and literary genius. To his credit are more than a dozen literary creations, which has enriched the heritage of Hindi literature. Agh Vinaash, Maha Pralay, Gyan Prakash, Shabd-Sagar, Param Granth, Prem-Path, Aagam Paddhati, being his important creations.

References

External links
 http://barabanki.nic.in/person.htm

Satnami
1727 births
1761 deaths
18th-century Hindu religious leaders
People from Barabanki, Uttar Pradesh